David File (born 1967) is a former New Zealand international lawn bowler.

Bowls career
He won two medals at the 1996 World Outdoor Bowls Championship; a silver in the triples and a bronze in the fours.

He won double gold at the 1995 Asia Pacific Bowls Championships, in Dunedin, New Zealand.

He was given a ten-year ban by Bowls Gisborne East Coast in 2010 for lewd behaviour, which was later revoked by Bowls New Zealand.

References

1967 births
Living people
New Zealand male bowls players